Angelo Donghia (March 7, 1935–April 10, 1985) was an American interior designer.

History
Donghia was born in Vandergrift, Pennsylvania, on March 7, 1935. He grew up spending time at his father's tailoring shop which is where his appreciation for design grew and developed. He realized his calling at a young age and by the time he turned 11 his father had granted him his first decorating job at the tailoring shop, for which Angelo Donghia would recall “The result was perhaps liked by some and hated by others, but that didn’t bother me. What mattered was that I had made something which was really the way I saw it and felt it.”

He left for New York City to study interior design at Parsons School of Design when he was 18 years old. After graduation Mr. Donghia joined the firm of Yale Burge Interiors, where Burge became his mentor and helped him hone his craft and develop a personal style. In 1966, on the recommendation of Billy Baldwin (interior designer), Mr. Donghia designed the Metropolitan Opera Club room at the Metropolitan Opera House at Lincoln Center which, with silver foil ceilings, blue chandeliers and black upholstery, was met with great acclaim. He was soon made partner of the design firm, then renamed Burge-Donghia.

At the time of his death on April 10, 1985, the New York-based Donghia Companies included five branches: Donghia Associates, Donghia Furniture, Donghia Textiles, Donghia Showrooms and Donghia Licensing.

Early career
Donghia was also one of the first in his field to realize the importance of extending his point of view to mass-market products. Donghia said: "I knew that what I had wasn't enough and that my growth had to be through means which weren’t the decorating business." By 1968 Mr. Donghia was already expanding with the establishment of &Vice Versa, a to-the-trade collection and showroom of fabrics and wallcoverings (later to become Donghia Textiles) originally inspired by the designs of friend Seymour Avigdor. Licensing his name and designs played a major role in Angelo Donghia's success and, concurrently with his interior design work, he began designing a number of products including an award-winning sheet and towel collection for J.P. Stevens, an affordable furniture collection for Kroehler, and coordinated dinner and barware for Toscany Imports Ltd.

After Yale Burge died in 1972, Burge-Donghia was renamed Donghia Associates and served the areas of residential, contract and hospitality interior design. Throughout the 1970s and 1980s Mr. Donghia's client list grew to include major corporations, cultural institutions, mass manufacturers, as well as a number of celebrities. Projects included the S.S Norway, the Omni International Hotels in Miami and Atlanta, and the St. Andrews Country Club in Florida, while Ralph Lauren, Halston, Donald Trump, Barbara Walters, Mary Tyler Moore, Liza Minnelli, Neil Simon, Grace Mirabella and Diana Ross were amongst his celebrity clientele.

His business continued to expand and in 1976 he opened the first of a series of Donghia Showrooms in Los Angeles. Well known for his entertaining, the opening reception included such names as Edith Head, Joel Schumacher, Diane Von Furstenburg and Norma Kamali. Soon after, in 1978, he founded Donghia Furniture, a collection of made-to-order upholstered furniture sold exclusively to the trade.

To this day Donghia, Inc. maintains the design philosophy of its founder. Angelo Donghia's vision lives on through the company and also through the Angelo Donghia Foundation, which provides scholarships each year to promising interior design students in the United States. The Foundation has made such donations as the Angelo Donghia Materials Library and Study Center at the Parsons School of Design and the Angelo Donghia Studio for Interior Architecture at the Rhode Island School of Design, as well as smaller donations to AIDS organizations for research and treatment.

Personal style
Donghia's design philosophy, a less is more approach, extended to all his projects. Inspired by Jean-Michel Frank, Angelo Donghia noted in a 1977 New York magazine piece, “I feel that I’ve developed my own style that is as classic and minimal as the thirties style it reflects.” Furthermore, he understood what people like and enjoy living with and had an uncanny ability to turn that knowledge into comfortable, elegant designs. “He starts with a concern for living,” stated the late Grace Mirabella, both a client and editor of Vogue. In his interiors he created total environments – not just rooms – on the tenet that “You should feel at all times that what is around you is attractive . . . and that you are attractive.” His trademarks included the use of silver gray, often through gray flannel, an attention to ceilings and “fat” furniture.
His design philosophy also translated into his homes, as indicated in the design of his sophisticated East Side Manhattan townhouse, relaxed late-Victorian Key West home, and traditional Lake Hill, Connecticut farm.

Awards
Angelo Donghia was the recipient of many awards during his lifetime including: the Tommy Award for Fabric Design, the Annual Euster Merchandise Mart Award for Outstanding Leadership in the Home Furnishings Industry, an Honorary Degree of Doctor of Fine Arts by The New School of Social Research and Parsons School of Design, the Marshall Field's “Distinction and Design” Award. He was also, posthumously, inducted into the Interior Design Hall of Fame.

Documentary
In 2016, editor at large produced a documentary film on the life and work of Angelo Donghia. Editor and filmmaker Julia Noran Johnston interviewed friends and colleagues close to the designer such as Paige Rense, Joel Schumacher, Melvin Dwork, John Boone, Ronald Bricke, Mario Buatta, Susan Buscavage, Chuck Chewning, Ann Sonet, and Masaru Suzuki.

References

"Cross Bones" by Kathy Reichs (published by Scribner) pg. 269.

External links
Donghia.com
Donghia Product
Donghia Digest
Architecturaldigest.com
Time.com
Editoratlarge.com
Imdb.com
Amazon.com
Editoratlarge.com

American interior designers
1935 births
1985 deaths
AIDS-related deaths in Pennsylvania
People from Vandergrift, Pennsylvania
American designers